Punkaharju is a former municipality of Finland. It was consolidated with the town of Savonlinna on January 1, 2013.

It was located in the province of Eastern Finland and is part of the Southern Savonia region.
The municipality was unilingually Finnish.

Finnish Forest Museum Lusto and the Finnish Forest Research Institute are located in Punkaharju, which hosts a research forest park open for visitors. Punkaharju ridge is a famous national landscape protected by a national reserve.

References

External links

 Punkaharju – Official site 

 
Populated places disestablished in 2013
Former municipalities of Finland
Populated places established in 1924